Mount Phillips is a mountain located on the border of Jasper National Park (Alberta) and Mount Robson Provincial Park (British Columbia). It is Alberta's 61st highest peak, and British Columbia's 84th highest peak. It was named in 1923 by J. Norman Collie after Donald "Curly" Phillips, a Jasper area outfitter and guide who made the disputed first ascent of Mount Robson in 1909.

See also
 List of peaks on the British Columbia–Alberta border

References

Mountains of Jasper National Park
Mount Robson Provincial Park
Three-thousanders of Alberta
Three-thousanders of British Columbia
Canadian Rockies